Can f 1 or canis familiaris allergen 1 is a lipocalin allergen produced by dogs in their tongue epithelial tissue.  It is homologous with the human lipocalin LCN1.

References

Allergology
Lipocalins
Mammalian proteins